Banking in Iraq roots from the beginning of the 20th century.

Iraq's two state-owned banks are the largest banks in Iraq.

Private Banks 
Iraq has many private banks that are operating today in many Governorates in Iraq

Supervision and regulation 

The Central Bank of Iraq supervises Iraqi banks.

Economy of Iraq
Iraq